An Angel for Satan is a 1966 Italian horror film directed by Camillo Mastrocinque. It stars Barbara Steele in a dual role, as Harriet Montebruno / Belinda, and is set in a small Italian village by a lake. It is based on a short novel by Luigi Emmanuele. This was Barbara Steele's last "Italian Gothic".

Plot
The Count of Montebruno, preparing his luxurious mansion for the arrival of his niece, discovers a mysterious old statue. After the niece arrives, strange events begin to happen, including deaths. It soon becomes clear that the newly found statue somehow influences the mental state of the Count's young niece. It turns out that Harriet Montebruno, one of the ancestors of the Count of Montebruno, was turned into a statue many years ago.

Cast 
Barbara Steele as Harriet Montebruno / Belinda 
Claudio Gora as Count Montebruno 
Ursula Davis as  	Rita 
Anthony Steffen as Roberto Merigi 
Marina Berti as  Illa
Aldo Berti as  	Victor 
Mario Brega as  Carlo Lionesi
Vassili Karis as  Dario, the Teacher

Release
An Angel for Satan was released in Italy on 4 May 1966 where it was distributed by Discobolo Film. It grossed 87 million Italian lira on its release.
In 2021, the film was released on DVD and Blu-Ray in the United States by Severin Films.

See also
List of Italian films of 1966
List of horror films of 1966

References

External links 
 

1966 films
Films directed by Camillo Mastrocinque
Films scored by Francesco De Masi
1966 horror films
Italian horror films
Films based on Italian novels
1960s Italian films